Before the Dawn was a concert residency by the English singer-songwriter Kate Bush in 2014 at the Hammersmith Apollo in London. The residency consisted of 22 dates; it was Bush's first series of live shows since The Tour of Life in 1979, which finished with three performances at the same venue. A live recording of the same name was released in physical and digital formats in November 2016.

On 21 March 2014, Bush announced via her website her plans to perform live. Pre-sale tickets were on sale for fans who had signed up to her website and an additional seven dates were added to the original 15, due to the high demand. Tickets were on sale to the general public on 28 March and were sold out within 15 minutes.

With the program, Bush won the Editor's Award at the Evening Standard Theatre Awards; and was subsequently nominated for two Q Awards in 2014: Best Act in the World Today and Best Live Act.

Overview

Before the Dawn was presented as a multi-media performance involving standard rock music performance, dancers, puppets, shadows, maskwork, conceptual staging, 3D animation and an illusionist. Bush spent three days in a flotation tank for filmed scenes that were played during the performance, and featured dialogue written by novelist David Mitchell. Also involved with the production were Adrian Noble, former artistic director and chief executive of the Royal Shakespeare Company, costume designer Brigitte Reiffenstuel, lighting designer Mark Henderson and Italian Shadows Theatre company Controluce Teatro d'Ombre. The illusionist was Paul Kieve, the puppeteer Basil Twist, the movement director Sian Williams and the designer Dick Bird. The video and projection design was by Jon Driscoll.

The performance was centred on a band featuring the following musicians:

Kate Bush – vocals (plus occasional piano/keyboards) 
David Rhodes – guitar
Friðrik Karlsson – guitar, bouzouki, charango
John Giblin – bass guitar, double bass
Jon Carin – keyboards, guitar, vocals, programming
Kevin McAlea – keyboards, accordion, uilleann pipes
Omar Hakim – drums
Mino Cinélu – percussion

and the following actors:

Albert McIntosh – chorus, Son, Painter
Jo Servi – chorus, Witchfinder
Bob Harms – chorus, Dad
Sandra Marvin – chorus
Jacqui DuBois – chorus
Ben Thompson – Lord of the Waves, Tesoro
Stuart Angell – Lord of the Waves, Painter's Apprentice
Christian Jenner – Blackbird Spirit
Sean Myatt, Richard Booth, Emily Cooper, Lane Paul Stewart, Charlotte Williams – Supporting actors

Bush's son, Albert McIntosh, who performed in the show as a backing vocalist and actor, was also credited as creative advisor. Keyboard player Kevin McAlea is notable for also having played on Bush's previous tour "The Tour of Life" in 1979.

Parts of the show told stories based on two Bush song-suites – "The Ninth Wave" from Hounds of Love and "A Sky of Honey" from Aerial.

During "The Ninth Wave", Bush's character is lost at sea after her ship, the Celtic Deep, sinks. She fades in and out of consciousness, sometimes underwater and sometimes above, hoping to be rescued with only a flickering red light to make her seen in the darkness. She has an almost out-of-body experience, observing herself as though under ice, seeing her family without her, and imagining entering earth's atmosphere until she is found; survival has given her a new appreciation of love and life. Then, in "A Sky of Honey", Bush portrays a bird-like woman observing the actions of a 19th-century painter and a wooden puppet.

Reception 

The news of the residency prompted a surge of interest in Bush, with a number of music websites, radio stations and newspapers running the story, as well as causing Bush's own website to crash due to the high web traffic. Bush was said to be "completely overwhelmed by the response to the shows", adding she was "looking forward to seeing you all later this year". In the week before the show's debut, The New York Times ran an article documenting Bush fans who were traveling from around the world to attend the show.

The show received widespread critical acclaim. The Evening Standard gave the opening show five stars out of five, commenting: "[an] extraordinary mix of magical ideas, stunning visuals, attention to detail and remarkable music ... she was so obviously, so unambiguously brilliant, made last night something to tell the grandchildren about." Alexis Petridis of The Guardian gave the show five stars out of five, calling the show "another remarkable achievement". Following the first week of performances, eight of Bush's albums charted within the UK Top 40, making her the first female artist in history to ever achieve this, with The Whole Story at number six and Hounds of Love at number nine being the highest charting.

Credits

Production credits
 Before the Dawn – written by Kate Bush
 Directed by – Kate Bush, Adrian Noble
 Creative advisor – Albert McIntosh
 Lighting designer – Mark Henderson
 Set designer – Dick Bird
 Projection designer – Jon Driscoll for Cinelumina
 Creative consultant – Robert Allsopp
 Costume designer – Brigitte Reiffenstuel
 Movement direction – Sian Williams
 Oceanic wave design – Basil Twist
 Illusionist – Paul Kieve

Tour management 
 Tour director - David Taraskevics (David T)
 Production director - Keely Myers
 Assistant to tour director - George Sinclair

Show production 
 Production manager - Simon Marlow
 Production coordinator - Georgie King
 Technical stage manager – Richard "Wez" Wearing
 Stage manager - Dan Shipton
 Show caller - Sharon Hobden
 Head of wardrobe - Natasha DeSampayo
 Wardrobe assistant - Kerry Harris
 Production runner - Dom Dryburgh

Sound credits
 Sound designer / FOH engineer – Greg Walsh
 Monitor engineer – Ian Newton
 Kate vocal navigator – Stephen W. Tayler
 FOH sound engineer / systems engineer – Davide Lombardi
 Stage tech – Baz Tymms
 Surround systems engineer – Davey Williamson
 Sounds FX consultant – James Drew
 Record archive – Ian Sylvester
 Record supervisor – Jim Jones

Backline credits
 Guitar and bass technician – Chris Lawson
 Keyboard (and guitar) technician – Morten "Turbo" Thobro
 Drums and percussion technician – Steve Gray

Set list 
The set list comprised most of Hounds of Love featuring the entire The Ninth Wave suite, most of Aerial including the entire A Sky of Honey suite, two songs from The Red Shoes, and one song from 50 Words for Snow. Bush's first four albums and The Sensual World were excluded from the set list, though a recording of "Never Be Mine" (supposedly from initial rehearsals) is included on the CD and LP releases.

All tracks were performed live for the first time, except "Running Up That Hill", which had been already performed live in 1987 with David Gilmour of Pink Floyd at the Secret Policeman's Third Ball.

Act One
"Lily"
"Hounds of Love"
"Joanni"
"Top of the City"
"Running Up That Hill (A Deal with God) (Extended)
"King of the Mountain" (Extended)
The Ninth Wave
Video Interlude – "And Dream of Sheep"
"Under Ice"
"Waking the Witch"
"Watching You Without Me"
"Jig of Life"
"Hello Earth"
"The Morning Fog"
Act TwoA Sky of Honey
"Prelude"
"Prologue" (extended)
"An Architect's Dream"
"The Painter's Link"
"Sunset"
"Aerial Tal"
"Somewhere in Between"  (extended)
"Tawny Moon"  (performed by Albert McIntosh)
"Nocturn"  (extended)
"Aerial"
Encore
"Among Angels"
"Cloudbusting"

Show dates 

 26 August 2014
 27 August 2014
 29 August 2014
 30 August 2014
 2 September 2014
 3 September 2014
 5 September 2014
 6 September 2014
 9 September 2014
 10 September 2014
 12 September 2014
 13 September 2014
 16 September 2014
 17 September 2014
 19 September 2014
 20 September 2014
 23 September 2014
 24 September 2014
 26 September 2014
 27 September 2014
 30 September 2014
 1 October 2014

References 

Kate Bush concert tours
2014 concert residencies
2014 in British music
2014 in London